Humera Masroor (born 5 August 1967) is a former Pakistani cricketer who played as a right-handed batter and occasional right-arm medium bowler. She appeared in one One Day International for Pakistan in 2006. She played domestic cricket for Karachi.

Her only WODI appearance came at the age of 38 at the 2005–06 Women's Asia Cup, against India in a losing cause.

References

External links
 
 

1967 births
Living people
Pakistani women cricketers
Pakistan women One Day International cricketers
Karachi women cricketers